The Southwestern Athletic Conference (SWAC) is a collegiate athletic conference headquartered in Birmingham, Alabama, which is made up of historically black colleges and universities (HBCUs) in the Southern United States. It participates in the NCAA's Division I for most sports; in football, it participates in the Football Championship Subdivision (FCS), formerly referred to as Division I-AA.

The SWAC is widely considered the premier HBCU conference and ranks among the elite in the nation in terms of alumni affiliated with professional sports teams, particularly in football.  On the gridiron, the conference has been the biggest draw on the Football Championship Subdivision (FCS) level of the NCAA, leading the nation in average home attendance every year except one since FCS has been in existence.  In 1994, the SWAC fell just 40,000 fans short of becoming the first non-Football Bowl Subdivision conference to attract one million fans to its home games.

History

In 1920, athletic officials from six Texas HBCUs — C.H. Fuller of Bishop College, Red Randolph and C.H. Patterson of Paul Quinn College, E.G. Evans, H.J. Evans and H.J. Starns of Prairie View A&M, D.C. Fuller of Texas College and G. Whitte Jordan of Wiley College — met in Houston to discuss common interests.  At this meeting, they agreed to form a new league, the SWAC.

Paul Quinn became the first of the original members to withdraw from the league in 1929. When Langston University of Oklahoma was admitted into the conference two years later, it began the migration of state-supported institutions into the SWAC. Southern University entered the ranks in 1934, followed by Arkansas AM&N (now the University of Arkansas at Pine Bluff) in 1936 and Texas Southern University in 1954.

Rapid growth in enrollment of the state-supported schools made it difficult for the church-supported schools to finance their athletics programs and one by one they fell victim to the growing prowess of the state-supported colleges. Huston–Tillotson (formerly Samuel Huston) withdrew from the conference in 1954, Bishop in 1956, and Langston in 1957—one year before the admittance of two more state-supported schools: Grambling College and Jackson State College. The enter-exit cycle continued in 1962 when Texas College withdrew, followed by the admittance of Alcorn A&M (now Alcorn State University) that same year. Wiley left in 1968, the same year Mississippi Valley State College entered. Arkansas AM&N exited in 1970 and Alabama State University entered in 1982. Arkansas–Pine Bluff (formerly Arkansas AM&N) rejoined the SWAC on July 1, 1997, regaining full-member status one year later. Alabama A&M University became the conference's tenth member when it became a full member in September 1999 after a one-year period as an affiliate SWAC member. Most of the former SWAC members that have left the conference are currently a part of the Red River Athletic Conference of the NAIA.

On 3 September 2020, the SWAC had announced that there would be a division realignment with the additions of Florida A&M University and Bethune-Cookman University beginning with the 2021–22 academic year; which both would compete in the SWAC East, while Alcorn State would be moving to the SWAC West.

Chronological timeline
 1920 — The Southwestern Athletic Conference (SWAC) was founded. Charter members included Bishop College, Paul Quinn College, Prairie View State Normal & Industrial College (now Prairie View A&M University), Samuel Huston College (Huston–Tillotson University), Texas College and Wiley College, effective beginning the 1920–21 academic year.
 1929 – Paul Quinn left the SWAC, effective after the 1928–29 academic year.
 1932 – Oklahoma Colored Agricultural and Normal University (now Langston University) joined the SWAC, effective in the 1932–33 academic year.
 1935 – Southern University joined the SWAC, effective in the 1935–36 academic year.
 1936 – Arkansas Agricultural, Mechanical & Normal College joined the SWAC, effective in the 1936–37 academic year.
 1954 – Huston–Tillotson left the SWAC, effective after the 1953–54 academic year.
 1954 – Texas Southern University joined the SWAC, effective in the 1954–55 academic year.
 1956 – Bishop left the SWAC, effective after the 1955–56 academic year.
 1957 – Langston left the SWAC, effective after the 1956–57 academic year.
 1958 – Grambling College (now Grambling State University) and Jackson College for Negro Teachers (now Jackson State University) joined the SWAC, effective in the 1958–59 academic year.
 1962 – Texas College left the SWAC, effective after the 1961–62 academic year.
 1962 – Alcorn Agricultural and Mechanical College (now Alcorn State University) joined the SWAC, effective in the 1962–63 academic year.
 1968 – Wiley left the SWAC, effective after the 1967–68 academic year.
 1968 – Mississippi Valley State College (now Mississippi Valley State University) joined the SWAC, effective in the 1968–69 academic year.
 1970 – Arkansas–Pine Bluff (UAPB) left the SWAC, effective after the 1969–70 academic year.
 1982 – Alabama State University joined the SWAC, effective in the 1982–83 academic year.
 1997 – Arkansas–Pine Bluff (UAPB) re-joined back to the SWAC as an affiliate member, effective in the 1997–98 academic year.
 1999 – Alabama Agricultural and Mechanical University joined the SWAC, effective in the 1999–2000 academic year.
 2021 – Bethune–Cookman University and Florida Agricultural and Mechanical University (Florida A&M) joined the SWAC, effective in the 2021–22 academic year.

Competitions
The SWAC is one of three conferences – the others being the Ivy League and the Mid-Eastern Athletic Conference – that does not automatically participate in the FCS football playoffs but can be invited via an at-large invitation as was the case in 2021 with SWAC member Florida A&M University who was invited over SWAC conference football champion Jackson State, who as the conference champion, was obligated via contract the SWAC has with the Celebration Bowl to play in the 2021 Celebration Bowl and so therefore could not participate in the FCS football playoffs. The SWAC instead splits its schools into two divisions, and plays a conference championship game. Three of the SWAC's teams, Alabama State in the Turkey Day Classic and Grambling and Southern in the Bayou Classic, play their last games of the regular season on Thanksgiving weekend, preventing the SWAC Championship from being decided until the first weekend of December, long after the tournament is underway. The SWAC has occasionally been a participant in bowl games, the most recent being the Celebration Bowl, which features the SWAC as one of its tie-ins.

Current championship competition offered by the SWAC includes competition for men in baseball, basketball, cross country, football, golf, indoor track, outdoor track & field and tennis. Women's competition is offered in the sports of basketball, bowling, cross country, golf, indoor track, outdoor track & field, soccer, softball, tennis and volleyball.

Member schools

Current full members
The SWAC currently has 12 full members, all but one are public schools:

Notes

Former members
The SWAC had six former full members, all but one were private schools:

Notes

Divisional realignment 
Alcorn State moved to the West Division with the additions of both Bethune–Cookman and Florida A&M in 2021.

Membership timeline

Sports
The SWAC sponsors championship competitions in eight men's and ten women's NCAA sanctioned sports:

Men's sponsored sports by school

Women's sponsored sports by school

Facilities

SWAC championships

Football
Prior to splitting into divisions and using a postseason championship game to decide its overall champion, the SWAC determined its champions by winning-percentage against conference opponents in regular season play.

In 1933 Langston appeared to win the title outright with a 4–0 conference record after the regular season, while Wiley finished 4–1, and Prairie View A&M finished 3–1. Langston was invited to the Prairie View Bowl, which was won by Prairie View. The Panthers subsequently declared themselves SWAC champions even though their claim was based on a postseason game. The SWAC seems to acknowledge both schools' claims to the title in the conference's football media guide, although some other sources including Michael Hurd's Black College Football, 1892–1992: One Hundred Years of History, Education, and Pride (1993) also list Wiley as an additional co-champion, apparently since all three schools had 4–1 records against conference opponents if the postseason game is incorporated into the regular season conference standings.

Prairie View vacated its 1941 championship. No championship was awarded in 1943 due to World War II. Grambling State vacated its 1975 championship due to a violation of SWAC rules for scheduling opponents.

Games from 1999 to 2012 were played at Legion Field in Birmingham, Alabama. The conference moved the game in 2013 to NRG Stadium in Houston, Texas. Starting in 2019, the game will officially be played at the first place team's home Since 2015, the winner of the SWAC plays the winner of the MEAC conference in an overall HBCU championship bowl game called the Celebration Bowl in Mercedes-Benz Stadium. The MEAC gave up its automatic bid to the FCS Playoffs for this game.

Texas Southern vacated its 2010 championship due to violations of NCAA rules.

The 2020–21 football season was played during Spring 2021 due to the COVID-19 pandemic.

Since splitting into western and eastern divisions and using a postseason championship game to decide its overall champion, the SWAC determines its division champions by winning-percentage against conference opponents in regular season play. For the 1999 season only, inter-divisional conference games did not count in the conference standings. Each division's outright champion or top-seeded co-champion advances to the championship game.

Texas Southern vacated its 2010 division championship due to violations of NCAA rules.

Note: an asterisk denotes the division's top-seeded co-champion and representative in the SWAC Championship Game; a double-asterisk denotes that the division's co-champion was ineligible for the SWAC Championship Game due to a violation of SWAC rules that were in effect from 2011 to 2014 concerning Academic Progress Rate (APR) scores.

Starting with the 2021 season with the additions of both Bethune-Cookman and Florida A&M, the football schedule is as follows:

 Each school plays eight conference games (five divisional, three non-divisional) and rotates three teams from the opposite division every two years.
 The best team in the SWAC gets to host the SWAC championship game. 
 The SWAC champion advances to the Celebration Bowl versus the MEAC champion. The loser ends its season.

Celebration Bowl results

Men's basketball

The 1977–78 season was the SWAC's first as an NCAA Division I basketball conference.

The semi-final and championship SWAC Basketball Tournament games are held at the Bill Harris Arena in Birmingham, Alabama. As of the 2017 tournaments, they feature an eight-team three-day layout with the quarterfinal rounds hosted on campus sites. This changes the previous 10-team, five-day tournament format. The higher seeded teams will host a combined eight games leaving two days for travel and practice rounds. The tournament concludes with the semi-finals and championship rounds inside Birmingham's Bill Harris Arena.  Winners of the tournaments earn automatic bids to their respective NCAA Division I Tournaments. The championship games are nationally televised live annually on an ESPN network.

Men's basketball tournament performance by school

Women's basketball

Baseball
This is a list of the last ten SWAC baseball champions; for the full history, see the list of Southwestern Athletic Conference baseball champions. In recent decades, the conference tournament has determined the overall champions; for specifics concerning the tournament in particular, see the Southwestern Athletic Conference baseball tournament.

SWAC marching bands

Marching bands have a rich tradition being a centerpiece of pride and school spirit for each institution in the conference.  Furthermore, the competitiveness, prestige, pageantry, and showmanship of SWAC marching bands significantly add to the unique identity and culture of the conference.

References

External links
 

 
Organizations based in Birmingham, Alabama
Sports organizations established in 1920
College sports in Alabama
College sports in Arkansas
College sports in Louisiana
College sports in Mississippi
College sports in Texas
Articles which contain graphical timelines
Sports and historically black universities and colleges in the United States